Highgate Hospital was a name used to refer to the infirmary building which opened in 1869 on the St Pancras side of Dartmouth Park Hill in Highgate, London.

History
The facility has its origins in the St Pancras Union Infirmary, which was designed by Giles and Biven and opened in 1866. 

Florence Nightingale advised the architects on the design of the building and later commented that it was "by far the best of any workhouse infirmary we have" and indeed “the finest metropolitan hospital”.

In 1869, Central London Sick Asylum District was altered to include St Pancras and the infirmary became known as Central London Sick Asylum. This arrangement continued until 1893, when it reverted to the Guardians of the Poor as St Pancras North Infirmary, while the St Pancras Union Workhouse on King's Way (now St Pancras Way) became St Pancras South Infirmary. Edith Cavell served as night superintendent from 1901 to 1904, when she was the only trained nurse on duty. 

The hospital was taken over by the London County Council in 1930 and renamed Highgate Hospital. It became the Highgate Wing of the Whittington Hospital on the establishment of the NHS in 1948.

Latterly a psychiatric hospital, in 2004, the Highgate Wing was chosen by Camden and Islington Community NHS Trust as the site for Highgate Mental Health Centre and the consolidation and development of community mental health and adult social care services.

See also
Archway Hospital

References

Defunct hospitals in London
Hospitals established in 1869
1869 establishments in England